The Men's Super Heavyweight Weightlifting Event (+105 kg) is the heaviest men's weight class event at the weightlifting competition, open to competitors over 105 kilograms of body mass. The competition at the 1999 World Weightlifting Championships took place in Athens, Greece.

Each lifter performed in both the snatch and clean and jerk lifts, with the final score being the sum of the lifter's best result in each. The athlete received three attempts in each of the two lifts; the score for the lift was the heaviest weight successfully lifted.

Medalists

Records

Results

New records

References
Weightlifting Databank
Weightlifting World Championships Seniors Statistics, Pages 30–31 

- Mens +105 kg, 1999 World Weightlifting Championships